Hunkar or Hünkar may also refer to:

 Hunkar (epic poem), an epic poem by Rashtrakavi Ramdhari Singh 'Dinkar'
 Hünkar (restaurant), a restaurant in Istanbul, Turkey
 Emperor
 Shah
 Sultan

See also 
 Hünkar Mosque (disambiguation)